The Rejected Woman is a 1924 American silent drama film directed by Albert Parker (in New York) and written by John Lynch. The film stars Alma Rubens, Conrad Nagel, and Béla Lugosi in a supporting role as Jean Gagnon. It was produced by Distinctive Pictures and distributed by Goldwyn-Cosmopolitan Distributing Corporation. A print of The Rejected Woman is preserved at the George Eastman House.

Plot
John Leslie (Nagel) is a rich, New York City man who leads a brilliant life. While piloting his plane in Canada, he meets Diane Du Prez (Rubens) while seeking refuge from a storm. Shortly after John returns to New York City, Diane moves to town and the two began dating. Leslie's friends are scandalized by the relationship as Diane is poor, shabbily dressed and unsophisticated. Unbeknownst to John, his business manager James Dunbar (Wyndham Standing) offers Diane financial assistance so that she can buy the clothing and receive the proper training to fit in with John's upper class friends. Diane's father Samuel (George MacQuarrie) attempts to dissuade Diane from accepting the offer but she disregards her father's advice as she is convinced that John will never love her unless she becomes well dressed and sophisticated.

Shortly thereafter, John and Diane marry. After John learns of the arrangement Diane has made with his business manager, he becomes angry and the two quarrel. The couple eventually reconcile after realizing their love is greater than their differences.

Cast

See also
 Béla Lugosi filmography

References

External links

Stills and newspaper articles at beladraculalugosi.com

1924 films
1924 drama films
Silent American drama films
American silent feature films
American black-and-white films
Films directed by Albert Parker
Goldwyn Pictures films
1920s American films